The Journal of Politics is a peer-reviewed academic journal of political science established in 1939 and published quarterly (February, May, August and November) by University of Chicago Press on behalf of the Southern Political Science Association.

According to the Journal Citation Reports, the journal has a 2015 impact factor of 1.840, ranking it 24th out of 163 journals in the category "Political Science".

See also 
 List of political science journals

References

External links 
 
 Online Access

Political science journals
Publications established in 1939
University of Chicago Press academic journals
Quarterly journals
English-language journals
Academic journals associated with learned and professional societies